A rod end bearing, also known as a heim joint (N. America) or rose joint (U.K. and elsewhere), is a mechanical articulating joint. Such joints are used on the ends of control rods, steering links, tie rods, or anywhere a precision articulating joint is required, and where a clevis end (which requires perfect 90-degree alignment between the attached shaft and the second component) is unsuitable. A ball swivel with an opening through which a bolt or other attaching hardware may pass is pressed into a circular casing with a threaded shaft attached. The threaded portion may be either male or female. The heim joint's advantage is that the ball insert permits the rod or bolt passing through it to be misaligned to a limited degree (an angle other than 90 degrees). A link terminated in two heim joints permits misalignment of their attached shafts (viz., other than 180 degrees).

History
The spherical rod end bearing was developed by Nazi Germany during World War II. When one of the first German planes to be shot down by the British in early 1940 was examined, they found this joint in use in the aircraft's control systems. Following this discovery, the Allied governments gave the H.G. Heim Company an exclusive patent to manufacture these joints in North America, while in the UK the patent passed to Rose Bearings Ltd. The ubiquity of these manufacturers in their respective markets led to the terms heim joint and rose joint becoming synonymous with their product. After the patents ran out the common names stuck, although  rosejoint remains a registered trademark of Minebea Mitsumi Inc., successor to Rose Bearings Ltd. Originally used in aircraft, the rod end bearing may be found in cars, trucks, race cars, motorcycles, lawn tractors, boats, industrial machines, go-karts, radio-control helicopters, formula cars, and many more applications.

Female heim joint 

Using female heim joints will allow users to make precise changes on key components of fixtures. One example of needing fine adjustment is within the helicopter’s adjustment of the blades. When using the adjustment, it is key to make sure it is in the correct spot or excessive wear will occur. This change allows quick adjustments that are easy with a female heim joint. When dealing with the pitch of a helicopter blades, heim joints are able to be adjusted to 0.010in. If spacing is critical, female heim joints are able to be threaded on, instead of welding inserts to the shaft. When dealing with aluminium shafts, the easiest way to use heim joints is to use the female heim joint. One example is using robots in robotics competitions. Light weight is a key factors when building competitive robots, so using aluminum rods and female heim joints can be key.  Another example using female heim joints is the shifter of motorcycles. The shifting mechanism allows forces to be applied linear, but still be able to work at angles when in different gears. Both male and female heim joints require the use of a lock nut after getting adjustment to correct specification needed.

See also 

 Ball joint

References

Linkages (mechanical)